San Clemente High School may refer to:

 San Clemente High School (San Clemente, California), a public high school in San Clemente, California, USA
 San Clemente High School (Mayfield, New South Wales), a Roman Catholic school in Mayfield, New South Wales, Australia